In statistics, the pseudomedian is a measure of centrality for data-sets and populations. It agrees with the median for symmetric data-sets or populations. In mathematical statistics, the pseudomedian is also a location parameter for probability distributions.

Description

When  is a symmetric distribution, the pseudomedian coincides with the median; otherwise this is not generally the case.

The Hodges–Lehmann statistic, defined as the median of all of the midpoints of pairs of observations, is a consistent estimator of the pseudomedian.

Like the set of medians, the pseudomedian is well defined for all probability distributions, even for the many distributions that lack modes or means.

Pseudomedian filter in signal processing

In signal processing there is another definition of pseudomedian filter for discrete signals.

For a time series of length 2N + 1, the pseudomedian is defined as follows. Construct N + 1 sliding windows each of length N + 1. For each window, compute the minimum and maximum. Across all N + 1 windows, find the maximum minimum and the minimum maximum. The pseudomedian is the average of these two quantities.

See also
Hodges–Lehmann estimator
Median filter
Lulu smoothing

References

Means
Summary statistics